Wesley Atkinson (born 13 October 1994) is an English former professional footballer who played as a right back.

Career

West Bromwich Albion
Atkinson was born in West Bromwich on 13 October 1994 and played for West Bromwich Albion's youth team. On 7 June 2013, West Bromwich Albion F.C. (WBA) gave him a third-year scholarship deal; a year later, he signed his first professional deal with the team and played with them until 2015. That November, he was loaned to Cambridge United until January 2015 despite being featured regularly in the club's under-21 side. On 13 December, Atkinson made his professional debut, replacing Tom Naylor in the 77th minute of a 0–0 home draw against Shrewsbury Town for the League Two championship.

At the end of the 2014–15 season, the club released Atkinson.

Notts County
Shortly after leaving WBA, Atkinson signed a one-year contract with Notts County. He was loaned briefly to Eastleigh F.C. in 2015. His contract with Notts County extended in June 2016 and he was loaned to Gateshead from November 2016 to January 2017. In March 2017, he was loaned to Alfreton Town F.C., where he finished out the season.

Rushall
Following a summer of training, Atkinson signed with Rushall Olympic F.C. in September 2017. He played with them for only two months before signing with Moors. Within a month, he signed with Boston and played for them from January to May 2018 before returning to Rushall in August. Two months later, he was approached by former Eastleigh manager Chris Todd and subsequently signed with Gloucester City A.F.C.

Gloucester
Atkinson played only one game with Gloucester; while competing in the Gloucestershire Senior Cup against Cirencester, he suffered an Anterior Cruciate Ligament injury that required surgery and prevented him from finishing out the 2018-2019 season or participating at all in 2019-2020.

Hednesford
He trialled for Hednesford Town F.C. during the summer of 2020 and was offered a non-contract deal for the 2020-2021 season. During a pre-season game, however, he Tore his Achilles Tendon and could not play for the rest of the season. During the summer of 2021, Hednesford reiterated their interest in him and Atkinson is currently expected to be in their 2021-2022 lineup.

Career statistics

References

External links

1994 births
Living people
Sportspeople from West Bromwich
English footballers
Association football defenders
West Bromwich Albion F.C. players
Cambridge United F.C. players
Notts County F.C. players
Eastleigh F.C. players
Gateshead F.C. players
Alfreton Town F.C. players
Solihull Moors F.C. players
Boston United F.C. players
Gloucester City A.F.C. players
Hednesford Town F.C. players
English Football League players